Bob Homani (born 12 December 1983) is a South African cricketer. He played 22 first-class and 10 List A matches between 2001 and 2007. He was also part of South Africa's squad for the 2000 Under-19 Cricket World Cup.

References

External links
 

1983 births
Living people
South African cricketers
Eastern Province cricketers
Western Province cricketers
Cricketers from Port Elizabeth